Miloud Mahfoud (born November 30, 1985 in Tiaret) is an Algerian football player. He is currently unattached, after playing for USM El Harrach in the Algerian Ligue Professionnelle 1.

Club career
In the summer of 2010, Mahfoud joined USM El Harrach from MB Sidi Chami. On February 15, 2011, Mahfoud made his professional debut for USM El Harrach as a starter in a league game against MC Alger. USM El Harrach won the game 1-0.

Honours
 Finalist of the Algerian Cup once with USM El Harrach in 2011

References

External links
 DZFoot Profile
 

1985 births
Living people
Algerian footballers
Algerian Ligue Professionnelle 1 players
USM El Harrach players
People from Tiaret
Association football goalkeepers
21st-century Algerian people